NF may refer to:

Companies and organizations
 Air Vanuatu (IATA airline designator NF), the national airline of Vanuatu
 National Front (disambiguation), the name of many political parties
 N.F.-Board, a defunct international football association
 Nuestra Familia, a Mexican American criminal organization
 National Forum (Croatia), a political party in Croatia
 Northwest Front, an American white nationalist group founded by Harold Covington
 Netflix, a US-based worldwide entertainment media provider

Places
 Newfoundland and Labrador, a Canadian province, former postal code NF
 Norfolk Island, part of the Commonwealth of Australia

Science, technology, and mathematics
 .nf, the internet country code top-level domain for Norfolk Island
 National Formulary, a manual of medicines
 Necrotizing fasciitis, a disease commonly known as flesh-eating bacteria
 Neurofibromatosis, a medical disorder in which nerve tissues grow tumors
 New Foundations, an axiomatic set theory in mathematical logic
 NF file format, used by TRUMPF machines
 NF mark, certification mark by the French AFNOR standards organization
 Nitrogen monofluoride
 Nod factor, a kind of molecule
 Noise figure, in radio and radar signal processing
 Normal forms, criteria for determining a table's degree of vulnerability to logical inconsistencies and anomalies

Other uses
 NF (rapper), American hip hop musician
 NF (EP), 2014
 Night Fighter, a fighter aircraft adapted for use in times of bad visibility
 No Funds, used on bank statements, sometimes written as N/F.

See also
 NF-κB, a protein complex that controls transcription of DNA, cytokine production and cell survival